University of Petra is a private university in Amman, Jordan. The University offers the Bachelor and Master Program, and it has more than 33 nationalities from Arab and foreign countries. The University is located on the airport road and features a green campus as well as facilities such as workplaces, laboratories, ceremonies and studios. It offers an applied education.

About the University
The university was established in 1991. Its first class graduated in 1994 and was then called the "Jordan University for Girls" since in its policy. It was adopted to be a university dedicated to girls. However, the name was respectively changed to University of Petra in 1999 for its new policy of allowing male students to join it.

The university offers a variety of programs at its eight faculties. Arabic is used for teaching of humanities, and English is used as the teaching medium in most of the other disciplines. New students undergo Arabic, English and IT assessment tests to specify their levels and are provided with intensive bridging courses if needed. The eight faculties are:

Information Technology
Architecture & Design
 Administrative & Financial Sciences (It was established since the establishment of the university in1991.)
 Arts & Sciences
 Law
 Pharmacy & Medical Sciences
 Mass Communication
 Engineering

Green University
In 2015, University of Petra transformed to a solar power system to generate full electric power from 1.5 MW. Previously, the university's energy consumption on campus for 2012 was 3,066,631 kWh and in 2013 the consumption decreased to 2,886,705 kWh. In 2014, power consumption dropped to 2.306.845 kWh as a result of changing a valve.
The university has its own artesian well and the water is treated to be suitable for its intended purposes (especially for drinking purposes) and provides the university with all its water needs.

Moreover, the university also has a sewage treatment plant and the water is completely treated in the plant to provide water for irrigation.
The campus is equipped with pedestrian crosswalks while buses and vehicles are not allowed to wander the university except on the ring road in order to enter and exit the campus.
The university has also a parking lot near the entrance gate which is a multi-story parking to accommodate vehicles with a capacity of 1000 cars. In addition, there are car parks next to the faculties for quick exit purposes.

Energy Conservation Program
University of Petra is committed to being positive and a creative force in protecting and improving the local and global environment. It is the university’s policy to reduce energy consumption wherever possible, through the activities and efforts of faculty, staff and students. Through the installation of lamps and devices to save energy, the university makes optimistic efforts to conserve energy. The University of Petra is also a local pioneer in the field of solar energy utilization to use the energy generated from the sun.

Water Conservation Program
University of Petra is committed to reducing water consumption. As a university, it encourages the reuse of water and wastewater, as wastewater reuse contributes greatly to the irrigation process within the university.

Recycling Program
University of Petra is committed to protecting the environment by implementing an effective waste management program. Waste management efforts include recycling, which is an important activity that helps conserve resources and land areas and reduces waste disposal costs. Beside that, the university uses both sides of paper, rather than buying packaging that quickly turns into waste, and reduce consumption by avoiding printing emails or webpages.

Transportation Policy
University of Petra follows strategies to reduce transportation costs by reducing driving. The university operates free buses within the campus. The university also provides a variety of transportation and free parking for students and faculty (The parking lot can accommodate 1,000 vehicles).

Academic staff profile
The University has about 193 qualified teaching staff members, and  the majority of which are Jordanians, but there are lecturers from many Arab countries such as Syria, and Iraq.

Students profile
Students are assisted to adapt to University life and culture by the Deanship of Student Affairs (DSA) and their academic advisors. At the start of each academic year, DSA organizes an orientation program for new students, in which seniors, starting with the University President, address them. They are provided with information on UOP rules and regulations and introduced to facilities therein. UOP provides transportation services for students for a nominal fee. The University also provides health insurance to all students and staff.

The University of Petra is home to about 1000 international students from 31 different countries.

The number of graduates from 2002/2003 until the end of the summer semester 2005/2006 is as follows:
2002/2003: 436
2003/2004: 632
2004/2005: 657
2005/2006: 772

Research
The Deanship of Graduate Studies and Research is the Center of the research activities at UOPP. It is formed of two councils; One for research activities and the other for graduate programs. In accordance with the accreditation criteria, stipulated by the Ministry of Higher Education and Scientific Research, 5% of each university’s budget is allocated to support research activities. The Deanship also financially supports the publication of textbooks and travel expenses of academic staff who participate in regional and international conferences.

See also
Ali H. S. Hajjaj

References

External links
 

 
1991 establishments in Jordan
Educational institutions established in 1991